In mathematics, the Tricomi–Carlitz polynomials or (Carlitz–)Karlin–McGregor polynomials are polynomials studied by  and  and , related to random walks on the positive integers.

They are given in terms of Laguerre polynomials by 

They are special cases of the Chihara–Ismail polynomials.

References

Orthogonal polynomials